Francesco Stringa (1578–1615) was an Italian painter of the early-Baroque era, active mainly near his native city of Modena.

He apprenticed initially, in 1595, in the Roman studio of Federico Zuccari, but soon came under the influence of the ascendant style of the Carracci. He returns in 1602–1606, to work for the Este court at Modena. In 1607, he worked with Ercole dell'Abate in decorating the ceiling of the Sala del Consiglio in the Palazzo Comunale. He also painted an Annunciation for Formigine and a Madonna and saints for the parish church of Fanano. In 1608, he became court painter for Duke Ranuccio I Farnese in Parma, where he painted a number of canvases now in the Capodimonte Museum in Naples. He died in Parma.

Among his pupils were Jacopino Consetti and Jacopo Zoboli.

External links

1578 births
1615 deaths
16th-century Italian painters
Italian male painters
17th-century Italian painters
Italian Baroque painters
Mannerist painters
Painters from Modena
Court painters